The International Communist League (LCI) was a Trotskyist political party in Vietnam. It was founded as the October Group in 1932, by a split in the Indochinese Bolshevik-Leninist Group, which also produced the Struggle Group. The group acquired its name from its journal, Thang muoi (October).

The October Group supported but did not join La Lutte, a united front of the Struggle Group and the Indochinese Communist Party (PCI), as it would have had to withhold its criticisms of the PCI.

The October Group grew rapidly and began publishing a newspaper, Le Militant. This was suppressed by the colonial government in 1937 for supporting strikes. As a result, they again began publishing October, along with a new newspaper, Tia Sang, which in 1939 became a daily - perhaps the world's first daily Trotskyist newspaper.

With the outbreak of World War II, the leading figures in the group were arrested and the organisation banned. Activity did not resume until August 1944, when it was renamed the "International Communist League".

The LCI fully supported the workers' uprising against colonial rule at the end of the war. It organised committees to take power in over 150 towns. Its membership grew rapidly, and it was able to establish printing presses. However, an attempt to organise an assembly of the committees in Saigon was broken up by Chief of Police Duong Bach Mai with the support of the PCI.

When a French expeditionary force arrived, the LCI organised a workers' militia, but its appeal for workers to arm themselves was not widely taken up. Ho Chi Minh of the PCI signed an agreement with the French, and the most of the leaders of the LCI were executed or had disappeared by early 1946.

See also 
 La Lutte
 Tạ Thu Thâu
 Ngo Van
 Trotskyism in Vietnam

References
The forgotten massacre of the Vietnamese Trotskyists
Ngo Van Xuyet, Ta Thu Thau: Vietnamese Trotskyist Leader

Banned political parties in Vietnam
Communist parties in Vietnam
Defunct political parties in Vietnam
Trotskyist organizations in Asia
Banned communist parties